Henry Bliss may refer to:

 Henry H. Bliss (1830–1899), first person killed by an automobile in the US
 Henry E. Bliss (1870–1955), American librarian and creator of the Bliss bibliographic classification
 Henry Edward Ernest Victor Bliss (1869–1926), British traveller and philanthropist commonly known as Baron Bliss
 Henry Bliss (author) (1797–1873), Canadian author, lawyer and provincial agent for New Brunswick and Nova Scotia

See also
 Harry Bliss (born 1964), American cartoonist and illustrator
 William Henry Bliss (1835–1911), English scholar